Wentnor is a village and civil parish in Shropshire, England.

It lies to the west of the Long Mynd and between the village and the hill range is the dispersed settlement of Prolly Moor. The nearest towns are Church Stretton and Bishop's Castle, the village of Asterton lies 1 mile to the south east of the village.

There is a parish church and two public houses: the "Crown" in the village itself and the "Inn on the Green" which is in a hamlet, just outside the village, by the River East Onny called The Green.

Transport 
The village no longer has a local bus service, Church Stretton railway station is 6 miles away and provides regular rail services to South Wales and the North.

See also
Listed buildings in Wentnor

References

Civil parishes in Shropshire
Villages in Shropshire